In Hellenistic philosophy, phantasiai (φαντασίαι) are pieces of information received from sense experience. The Pyrrhonists, Epicureans, and the Stoics use the term to refer to information received through the senses and arising in thoughts.  

In Stoicism the phantasiai represent pre-cognitive judgments originating from our previous experiences or our subconscious thinking. The founder of Stoicism, Zeno of Citium, suggested that the soul is imprinted by the senses much in the same way as a signet ring imprints its shape in soft wax; all psychological states and activities, such as mental assent, cognition, impulse, and knowledge are all either extensions or responses to  phantasiai. According to the Epictetus, doxa the sage avoids doxa, a weak or false belief, by withholding assent when conditions do not permit a clear and certain grasp of the truth of a matter. Some phantasiai experienced in perceptually ideal circumstances, however, are so clear and distinct that they could only come from a real object; these were said to be kataleptikê (fit to grasp). The kataleptic phantasiai compels assent by its very clarity and represents the criterion of truth.

Notes

Concepts in ancient Greek epistemology
Concepts in ancient Greek philosophy of mind
Greek words and phrases
Epicureanism
Pyrrhonism
Skepticism
Stoicism